Sonja Mikkelsen (born 20 June 1955) is a Danish politician. 

She was born in Thy to Kristian Mikkelsen and Margith Nielsen, and married Ole Kristensen in 1990. She was elected member of Folketinget for the Social Democrats from 1981 to 1984, and again from 1990. She was appointed Minister for Traffic from 1998 to 2000, and Minister for Health in 2000, as member of the Poul Nyrup Rasmussen IV Cabinet.

References

1955 births
Living people
Government ministers of Denmark
Social Democrats (Denmark) politicians
20th-century Danish politicians
20th-century Danish women politicians
Women government ministers of Denmark
Transport ministers of Denmark
Danish Health Ministers